FSV may refer to:
 Fidelity Special Values, a British investment trust
 File System Visualizer, a file manager for Linux and other Unix-like operating systems
 Fort St. Vrain Generating Station, in Colorado, United States
 M1131 Fire Support Vehicle
Fullskip Void, in Realm of the Mad God